bmobile is a Mobile Phone, Home Security provider, and fixed wireless provider of Trinidad and Tobago, operating as a division of TSTT.

History
TSTT has re-branded its mobile division to bmobile along with other Cable & Wireless companies in the Caribbean. Since then almost all the other Caribbean mobile divisions have been re-branded to LIME and now FLOW.

In 2007 they began launching data services (fixed wireless) on a CDMA2000 EVDO network. This was later upgraded to WiMAX and then to LTE. The network operates on LTE band 41 (2.5 GHz)

On June 14, 2011, they began to sell the Apple iPhone 3GS and iPhone 4.

In March 2014 the company announced 3G HSPA+ data services to all customers.

Part of its 5-year strategy, bmobile refreshed its brand and announced a launch of HD Voice over its 3G network as well as improved speeds over its existing HSPA+ network. Days later, on December 9, 2016, the company went live with its LTE network which, at the time of launch, was only available in Port of Spain, San Fernando, and soon after, a few locations in Tobago  on  LTE Band 2 (1900 MHz). Service was launched on LTE Band 28 (700 MHz) in October 2020.

In order for bmobile to do an LTE rollout however, the company decommissioned its 2G GSM 1900 MHz network.

bmobile's parent company also purchased Massy Communications, now branded as AMPLIA, a move which saw the company increase its market share against the Caribbean-heavyweights, FLOW and Digicel. AMPLIA offers TV and fiber broadband services and also resells bmobile's landline and home security services.

Radio frequency summary
bmobile operates GSM, UMTS and LTE mobile networks and a Fixed Wireless LTE network in all of Trinidad and Tobago. The company launched a limitedly available FWB NR network in December 2018.

The following is a list of known frequencies that bmobile employs in Trinidad and Tobago:

See also
 Telecommunications Services of Trinidad and Tobago
 List of mobile network operators of the Americas

References

External links
bmobile website

Mobile phone companies of Trinidad and Tobago
Mass media companies of Trinidad and Tobago
Public–private partnership
Government-owned companies of Trinidad and Tobago
Brands of Trinidad and Tobago